Kui  is a Kipchak instrumental musical composition performed with national plucked, bow and wind instruments such as dombyra, qobyz, syrnai, mostly with the plucked dombyra of the Kazakhs and Komuz of the Kyrgyzs. In the 20th century, Kazakh Soviet musicians experimented with chorus performance of kuis.

Kui in Kazakh culture performed with dombyra

In Kazakh culture kuis were learned by heart and passed from generation to generation without written fixation. For example, Kazakh folk Kui “aqsaq qulan” (lame onager) is dated to the 13th century. Authors of many Kazakh kuis lived in the Middle Ages. But the pick of the culture is from the 19th and 20th centuries. Kui tradition included also verbal part that explained in detail the story for the its compositions, personalities, reasons and legends. Before performing the kui, the performer used to give a story about the composition to play, so the auditory could get proper feelings. But by the time the verbal tradition for kuis was finally separated from instrumental performances and only few kuishi (performer of kui) still keep this part of the tradition.

Ancient composers of kuis

Dombyra Kuis were formed in the result of centuries-old folk instrumental performance tradition. There are many outstanding middle age musicians in Kazakh history: 
Sypyra-Zhyrau (14th century)
Qaztugan or Abulqadir (15th century)
Asanqaigy (14th-15th centuries)
Baizhigit (15th-16th centuries)

But the peak of the culture was achieved by the middle of 19th century. Then very many composers lived who created kuis:
Qurmangazy Sagyrbai (1823–1889)
Mahambet Otemisuly (Utemisov, 1803–1846)
Dauletkerei Shygauly (Shygaev, 1821–1875 )
Tattimbet Qazangapuly (Kazangapov, 1817–1862)
Abyl Taraquly, (Taraqov, 1820–1892)
Esbai (1810–1901)
Qazangap (1854–1921)
Toqa Shonmanuly (Shonmanov, 1830–1904) and others

The female composer Dina Nurpeisqyzy, or Dina Nurpisova (1861–1955) also began then her career.

Types of kui

There are both folk kuis and kuis composed by authors. It is said that folks kuis may take their beginning from ritual worship acts of nomad tribes. Every kuishi (performer of kui) had his own unique technique and features.

The themes of kuis are very different: from philosophic thoughts to the wildness of nature. For example, Dauletkerei's kui, "Zhiger", which means “Energy to Live” or Qazangap's Kui “Kokil” which means “Melody of my Soul”; Osen Tore's Kui, “Ottin Dunie, Kettin Dunie” which means “My Days Have Passed”. Other kuis represent detailed psychological portraits of individuals (Qurmangazy's Kui “Toremurat” – the name of a male person; Mamen's Kui “Aqsholpan” which is the name of a woman; Dina's “Asem Qonyr”). Other kuis are about mother land – vast fields of steppe: Qurmangazy's kui "Sary Arqa" which means “Golden Steppe”; Tattimbet's kui “Sarzhailau” – "Golden Plateau"; Bogda's kui “Zhem Suynyn Tasqyny” means “Flood of the Zhem River”.

The other part of kuis is dedicated to events in the lives of kuishis or composers. (Qurmangazy's Kui “Aman Bol Sheshem, Aman Bol” means "Take Care, Mama, Take Care"; Tattimbet's Kui “Kokei Kesti”, or internal disturbance; Dina's “Qaraqasqa At” means a dark horse with white spot on its head.

Another group of kuis is dedicated to the birds and animals: folks’ “Bozingen” means white female camel, Telkqonyr-which is the name of a horse; Ashimtai's “Qonyr Qaz” means “Brown Goose”; Sugir's Kui “Aqqu” means “White Wwan”. Nomads expressed the environment of their daily life very thoroughly through kuis.

Kui tradition

Western  reflect dramatic events, give very strong aggressive associations. These are composed according to its rules – a certain sequence of tone sets on the Dombyra neck.

Shertpe kuis do not have such rules for composing. They are very melodic and seem to be a soundtrack for songs. They are free in the style and give very deep, gentle and soft associations.

The biggest figure in kui tradition is Qurmangazy from the Western school of kui tradition. He created the biggest hits among kui compositions. Shertpe tradition is represented by Baizhigit, Tattimbet, Toqa, Dairabai, Sugur, Ryzdyq, Abiken, Tolegen and many others.

References 

From the National Library of the Republic of Kazakhstan. Books in Russian.
1. Akishev K.A.  "Kurgan of Issyk". — Moscow, 1978.
2. Alekseeva L. А., Nazhmedenov Zh. "Uniqueness of the Kazakh dombyra sound and tuning//Kazakh Culture:researches. Scientific articles brochure, Almaty, 2000.
3. Alekseeva L. А., Nazhmedenov Zh. Features of Kazakh Dombyra.// My i vselennaya journal. 2001.No. 1(6), p52-54.
4. Amanov B. Terms of compositions for dombyra Kui. Alma-Ata, 1982.
5. Aravin P.V. Steppe's stars. — Alma-ata, 1979.
6. Aravin P.V. Great Kuishi Dauletkerei.-Alma-ata, 1964.
7. Asafjef B.V. About Kazakh folk music.//Musical culture of Kazakhstan.-Alma-Ata, 1955.
8. Baramankulov M. Turkic space.-Almaty, 1996.
9. Vyzgo T. Musical instrumentsof the Central Asia.-Moscow, 1980.
10. Gizatov B.. Social and esthetic basics of Kazakh folk instrumental music.-Alma-Ata, 1989.
11. Zhubanov A.K. Dombyra-Kazakh national instrument.//Muzykoznanie journal.-Alma-Ata, 1976. p. 8-10.
12. Stakhov V. Arts od violin master. — Leningrad, 1988.
13. Nazhmedenov Zh. Acoustic features of Kazakh Dombyra. Aktobe, 2003.
14. Utegalieva S.I. Dombyra tradition in Mangystau. Almaty, 1997.

External links 
 National library of the Republic of Kazakhstan [1]
 Mura ethnic heritage project [2]

Kipchaks
Kazakhstani music
Kyrgyz music